Sorbus pseudofennica (also called Arran service-tree or Arran cut-leaved whitebeam) is a species of plant in the family Rosaceae. Endemic to the Isle of Arran in Scotland, it is threatened by habitat loss. It is thought to be a naturally occurring hybrid between S. arranensis and S. aucuparia, probably with additional backcrossing with S. aucuparia. Sorbus arranensis is itself a hybrid between S. rupicola and S. aucuparia. Apomixis and hybridization are common in some groups of Sorbus species.

See also 
Arran whitebeams
Spier's School - a mature example grows here.

References

External links

 Commentary and video of Sorbus pseudofennica.

pseudofennica
Endemic flora of Scotland
Vulnerable plants
Endemic biota of the Scottish islands
Isle of Arran
Taxonomy articles created by Polbot